Inverno e Monteleone is a comune (municipality) in the Province of Pavia in the Italian region Lombardy, located about 35 km southeast of Milan and about 20 km east of Pavia.

Inverno e Monteleone borders the following municipalities: Corteolona e Genzone, Gerenzago, Miradolo Terme, Sant'Angelo Lodigiano, Santa Cristina e Bissone, Villanterio.

References

External links 
 Inverno su The Campanile Project

Cities and towns in Lombardy